The 1990–91 Asian Club Championship was the 10th edition of the annual Asian club football competition hosted by Asian Football Confederation.
Representative clubs of 30 Asian countries played games in this tournament. 
Esteghlal FC from Iran won the final and became Asian champions for the second time. They are championed in 1970 as Taj.

Group stage

Group 1

Played in Baghdad, Iraq

Group 2

Esteghlal qualified 2–1 on aggregate.

Group 3
The Gulf Cooperation Council Club Tournament was cancelled due to the crisis in the region; the participants would have been  Bahrain Club,  Al-Arabi,  Al-Nassr and  Al-Sharjah, who all withdrew.

Group 4

Played in Quetta, Pakistan

Group 5

Played in Dhaka, Bangladesh

Group 6
Run parallel with ASEAN Club Championship

Played in Singapore

Group 7

Played in Pyongyang, North Korea

Quarter-finals
Played in Dhaka, Bangladesh

Group A

Al Rasheed (Iraq) withdrew due to the Gulf War, and were replaced by Al Ramtha (Jordan), who were disqualified for not paying the second round entry fee.

Group B

Semi-finals

Third Place

Final

 Top scorer
 Samad Marfavi (6 goals)

References
Asian Club Competitions 1991 at RSSSF.com

1991 in Asian football
1990 in Asian football
1990-91